İsmail Akşoy (born 10 August 1989 in Antalya) is a Turkish former professional cyclist.

Major results

2009
 3rd Road race, National Under-23 Road Championships
2011
 1st Stage 6 Tour du Maroc
 1st Stage 4 Tour of Gallipoli
 1st Stage 1 (ITT) Tour of Alanya
2015
 1st Stage 3 Tour of Iran (Azerbaijan)
 1st Stage 3 Tour of Çanakkale
 8th GP Al Massira, Les Challenges de la Marche Verte

References

External links

1989 births
Living people
Turkish male cyclists
21st-century Turkish people